"Ice Cream", released in 1995, is the third solo single by Wu-Tang Clan member Raekwon, from his debut studio album Only Built 4 Cuban Linx... (1995). The song features Wu-Tang Clan members Method Man in the intro, chorus and outro, Ghostface Killah in the first verse, and Cappadonna in the third.

The single's B-side, "Incarcerated Scarfaces", was featured in the soundtrack of the video game Grand Theft Auto: Liberty City Stories (2005). Both songs are included on the compilation album The RZA Hits (1999). 

Lauryn Hill sampled "Ice Cream" on her song "I Used to Love Him", from her 1998 album, The Miseducation of Lauryn Hill. The Game remixed "Ice Cream" with his "Can't Understand" freestyle in 2004.

Samples
"Ice Cream Man" by Eddie Murphy (the repeated phrase "The Ice Cream Man is coming!!")
"Ice Cream Man (rare demo)" by Method Man
"A Time For Love" by Earl Klugh
"The Breakdown (Part II)" by Rufus Thomas

Music video
The music video features a cameo by Sam Sneed, Shyheim, Tyson Beckford, Soul For Real, and Irv Gotti

Charts

See also
1995 in music

External links

1995 singles
Song recordings produced by RZA
Songs written by Method Man
Method Man songs
Ghostface Killah songs
1995 songs
Songs written by Ghostface Killah
Songs written by Raekwon
Raekwon songs
Dirty rap songs
Hardcore hip hop songs